Mancherial district is a district located in the northern region of the Indian state of Telangana. The district comprises 18 mandals and two revenue divisions – Mancherial and Bellampalli. The district headquarters is located at Mancherial town. It is surrounded by Komaram Bheem, Nirmal, Jagtial, Peddapalli and Bhupalpally districts of Telangana and with Maharashtra state.

History 
Mancherial district was created out of Adilabad district in 2016 during the general reorganization of districts in Telangana.

Administrative divisions 
The district has two revenue divisions of Mancherial, Bellampally which are sub-divided into 18 mandals. Smt. Bharathi Hollikeri, IAS is the present collector of the district.

Mancherial District Revenue Divisions Mandals Information Lists

Geography 

It shares borders with Gadchiroli district of Maharashtra on the east, Jayashankar Bhupalpally, Peddapalli and Jagitial districts to the south, Nirmal district to the west and Kumaram Bheem district to the north.

The district is very fertile plains fed by the Godavari river, which forms the southern border of the district.

Demographics 
 Census of India, the district has a population of 807,037, with a ratio of 977 females to 1000 males. The literacy rate is 64.35%. There are 148,377 farmers and 344,785 labourers. Scheduled Castes and Scheduled Tribes make up 24.71% and 7.06% of the population respectively.

At the time of the 2011 census, 87.61% of the population spoke Telugu, 5.12% Urdu, 1.66% Lambadi, 1.49% Marathi and 1.44% Gondi as their first language.

Transport 
Mancherial is well connected with all types of transport facilities major are Road and Rail. Mancherial railway station is the train station with code: MCI.

TSRTC has its depot in Mancherial connecting transportation facility to the citizens to every village and city of Mancherial District.

NH 63 Jagdalpur to yedashi via renapur latur bodhan nizamabad passes through Mancherial.

A new National highway is being constructed from Mancherial  to Chandrapur.

Also another new National highway is sanctioned from Jaipur Mandal to Warangal via Manthani and Bhupalpally. This Highway is named as Green Industrial corridor by NHAI.

See also 
 List of districts in Telangana

References 

 
Districts of Telangana